Centenary is a neighborhood in New City, New York, United States, the county seat of Rockland County. Located on the north-easternmost side of the hamlet, just south of Haverstraw, southeast of High Tor State Park, northwest of Dr. Davis Farm, and northeast of the neighborhood of Brownsell Corner. It is one of the most rural parts of New City. 

Centenary Church, now desanctified and converted to a residence, marks the historic center at South Mountain Road near the intersection of Old Route 304.

Well-known residents have included Carlos Castaneda, who resided on High Tor Road in the 1970s.

External links
 

Hamlets in New York (state)
Hamlets in Rockland County, New York

ar:مقاطعة روكلاند، نيويورك
cs:Rockland County
de:Rockland County
es:Condado de Rockland
fr:Comté de Rockland
bpy:রকল্যান্ড কাউন্টি, নিউ ইয়র্ক
it:Contea di Rockland
nl:Rockland County
ja:ロックランド郡 (ニューヨーク州)
no:Rockland County
nds:Rockland County
pl:Hrabstwo Rockland
fi:Rocklandin piirikunta
yi:ראקלענד קאונטי
zh:羅克蘭縣 (紐約州)